59th General Assembly of Nova Scotia represented Nova Scotia from 2003 to 2006, its membership being set in the 2003 Nova Scotia election.  No party held a majority of the seats, but the Progressive Conservative Party of Nova Scotia, under John Hamm, held the most and thus formed a minority government. Rodney MacDonald became PC leader and premier in February 2006 after Hamm's resignation. The Assembly was dissolved May 13, 2006, at MacDonald's request.

Seating Plan

Division of seats

List of members

Note:Premier in italics, ministers in bold.'

Notes
 Russell MacKinnon was elected as a Liberal but left the party on April 7, 2005. In voting matters he sides with the PCs.
 John Chataway of the Progressive Conservatives held this seat until his death on December 31, 2004. He was replaced by Judy Streatch in a 2005 by-election.
  Danny Graham resigned as the MLA for Halifax Citadel on October 7, 2005. A by-election was set, but was then superseded by the 2006 general election.

Terms of the General Assembly of Nova Scotia
2003 establishments in Nova Scotia
2006 disestablishments in Nova Scotia